Pedro da Fonseca or Pedro Fonseca may refer to:

 Pedro da Fonseca (cardinal) (died 1422), Portuguese cardinal
 Pedro da Fonseca (philosopher) (1528–1599), Portuguese Jesuit philosopher and theologian
 Pedro Vicente Fonseca (born 1935), retired Brazilian basketball player 
 Pedro Fonseca (footballer) (born 1997), Brazilian footballer

See also 
 Peter Fonseca (born 1966), Canadian politician